William Wilson Cash DSO OBE (12 June 1880 – 18 July 1955) was an Anglican Bishop in the middle part of the 20th century.   Cash was unusual for a bishop of a diocese in England at that time in that he was not public school nor Oxbridge educated.

Life and career
Wilson Cash was educated in Sale and became a CMS missionary in 1902. Ordained in 1911 he was appointed a Chaplain to the Forces in 1916.     He greatly impressed the Chaplain-General at his interview who described Cash as 'A1,a Man'. Cash served in Egypt and Mesopotamia and ended the War with a DSO and OBE and was five times Mentioned in Despatches.    He preached at the Thanksgiving Service in St George's Cathedral following General Allenby's triumphant march into Jerusalem. Afterwards he was General Secretary of the Society until his elevation to the episcopate as Bishop of Worcester in 1941.   He had previously turned down invitations to be Bishop of Jerusalem and Archbishop of Sydney An Honorary Chaplain to the King, he died in post. It appears that his military experience never left him, and this was reflected in one of the tributes paid to him on his death.

'There was very much the soldier in the Bishop's outlook.    He was always on service, always disciplined ...'

References

1880 births
People from Cheshire
Companions of the Distinguished Service Order
Officers of the Order of the British Empire
Honorary Chaplains to the Queen
Honorary Chaplains to the King
Bishops of Worcester
20th-century Church of England bishops
World War I chaplains
1955 deaths
Royal Army Chaplains' Department officers